Gongguan Township is a rural township near the center of Miaoli County, Taiwan. Its climate is sub-tropical, mild and very rainy. The yearly average humidity is 80%.

Geography
As of January 2023, it had 10,676 households and a total population of 31,453.

Administrative divisions
The township comprises 19 villages: Beihe, Dakeng, Fude, Fuji, Fuxing, Guannan, Guantung, Guanzhong, Hegang, Heshan, Jianshan, Kaikuang, Nanhe, Renan, Shiqiang, Wugu, Yugu, Yuquan and Zhongyi.

Politics
The township is part of Miaoli County Constituency II electoral district for Legislative Yuan.

Economy
Oil and gas has been discovered and explored in the area since more than a century ago.

Transportation
 United Bus Gongguan Station 
 Hsinchu Bus Gongguan Station 
 Sun Yat-sen Freeway Miaoli Interchange 
 Ta1 6 Line 
 County Road 128:Tongxiao － Sihu Hsiang Shuijiapu － Tongluo Hsiang － Gongguan Hsiang 
 Miao 26-2:Miaoli City Sindong Street—Sindong Bridge－Gongguan Hsiang Beihe—Siyi Tunnel—Shihtan Hsiang 
 Tai 72:EXPRESSWAY Houlong - Wenshui 
 County Road 119甲:Kesu Bridge—Gongguan Along Mountain Way
 Xindong Bridge

Tourist attractions
 Miaoli Ceramics Museum
 Taiwan Oil Field Exhibition Hall
 Wugu Cultural Village
 Taiwan Seri-Apiculture and Entomology Education Park

Notable natives
 Yang Jih-sung, former forensic scientist
 Yuhan Su, jazz vibraphonist and composer

References

External links

  

Townships in Miaoli County